The 18th Actors and Actresses Union Awards ceremony was held on 9 March 2009 at the Teatro Circo Price in Madrid.

The cast of Camino swept most of the film awards. The gala was directed by actress and dancer Eva del Palacio.

Winners and nominees 
The winners and nominees are listed as follows:

Film

Television

Theatre

Newcomers

References 

Actors and Actresses Union Awards
2009 in Madrid
2009 television awards
2009 film awards
2009 theatre awards
March 2009 events in Europe